Guo Liang (December 3, 1901 – March 29, 1928; born in Wenjiaba, Tongguan, Changsha) was a communist, one of famous leaders of the early worker's movement in Hunan. Guo was Mao Zedong's revolutionary follower and was killed by the Hunan Kuomintang authority on March 29, 1928.

Career
Guo entered into the First Normal School of Hunan to study in 1920. When Mao Zedong served as a school officer of the affiliated primary school in First Normal School, Guo turned to Mao for advice and he had a close relationship with Mao. Guo joined in the Xinmin Institute by Mao's recommendation in 1920 and became a CPC member while Mao was as his referrer in 1921.

At that time he was ready to go to Yueyang and organize an armed uprising, Guo was betrayed by traitors and arrested on March 27. the next day he was sent to Changsha, and was Killed by decapitation of Kuomintang authority on March 29. after his death, his head was as a warning sign hung for three 3 days at Simenkou, also hung for three 3 days at Dongshansi of Tongguan.

References

1901 births
1928 deaths
Politicians from Changsha
People executed by the Republic of China by decapitation
Chinese revolutionaries